Steve Walsh (born 13 April 1958) is an Australian former professional rugby league footballer who played for the South Sydney Rabbitohs.

Biography
Walsh, who went to Marcellin College, played rugby union for Randwick in the late 1970s.

A full-back, Walsh played first-grade with South Sydney from 1980 to 1983. During his career he made a total of 58 premiership appearances, which included the 1980 finals series. He was a member of South Sydney's 1981 Tooth Cup premiership winning team and was Man of the Match in the grand final win over Cronulla.

He now lives in Pittsburgh, Pennsylvania, U.S.A.

References

External links
Steve Walsh at Rugby League project

1958 births
Living people
Australian rugby league players
South Sydney Rabbitohs players
Rugby league fullbacks
Rugby league players from Sydney
Australian rugby union players
Australian expatriates in the United States